Ridgeway Glacier is a short glacier in the east part of Mountaineer Range, draining southeast between Spatulate Ridge and Gauntlet Ridge into Lady Newnes Bay, Victoria Land. Named by New Zealand Antarctic Place-Names Committee (NZ-APC) in 1966 for Norman Ridgeway, senior scientist at Hallett Station, 1963–64.
 

Glaciers of Victoria Land
Borchgrevink Coast